Cora marusae is a species of basidiolichen in the family Hygrophoraceae. Found in Mexico, it was formally described as a new species in 2019 by Bibiana Moncada, Rosa Emilia Pérez-Pérez, and Robert Lücking. Here it grows as an epiphyte on tree trunks, often sympatrically with Cora benitoana and C. buapana. The specific epithet marusae honours Mexican lichenologist María de los Ángeles Herrera-Campos, a friend and colleague of the authors.

References

marusae
Lichen species
Lichens described in 2019
Lichens of Mexico
Taxa named by Robert Lücking
Basidiolichens